The 2018 Tennessee Tech Golden Eagles football team represented Tennessee Technological University as a member of Ohio Valley Conference (OVC) during the 2018 NCAA Division I FCS football season. Led by first-year head coach Dewayne Alexander, the Golden Eagles compiled an overall record of 1–10 overall with a mark of 1–7 in conference play, placing last out of nine teams in the OVC. Tennessee Tech played home games at Tucker Stadium in Cookeville, Tennessee.

Previous season
The Golden Eagles finished the 2017 season 1–10, 1–7 in OVC play to finish in last place.

On November 19, 2017, head coach Marcus Satterfield was fired. He finished at Tennessee Tech with a two-year record of 6–16.

Preseason

OVC media poll
On July 20, 2018, the media covering the OVC released their preseason poll with the Golden Eagles predicted to finish in last place. On July 23, the OVC released their coaches poll with the Golden Eagles also predicted to finish in last place.

Preseason All-OVC team
The Golden Eagles had two players selected to the preseason all-OVC team.

Defense

Tim Collins – DL

Specialists

Nick Madonia – P

Schedule

Game summaries

at Chattanooga

Kennesaw State

at Utah State

at Jacksonville State

Eastern Illinois

Southeast Missouri State

at Tennessee State

at Austin Peay

Murray State

at UT Martin

Eastern Kentucky

References

Tennessee Tech
Tennessee Tech Golden Eagles football seasons
Tennessee Tech Golden Eagles football